The Cancionero Musical de Montecassino (Montecassino, Biblioteca dell'Abbazia, 871), known by the abbreviation "(CMM)" is an important Neapolitan manuscript of music from the 1480s, containing many otherwise unknown compositions.

References

Italian music
Renaissance music manuscript sources